Carl Albert Löschhorn (27 June 1819 in Berlin – 4 June 1905) was a German composer, pianist and piano pedagogue. He taught in Berlin. Some of his piano studies are still popular today, including Op.65/66/67 of which the Étude op. 66 no.22 is best known.

Life 
Löschhorn took piano lessons with Ludwig Berger from 1837 and studied composition at the Royal Music Institute of Berlin after Berger's death (1839) with August Wilhelm Bach and Eduard Grell and piano with Berger's pupil Rudolph Killitschgy. After Killitschgy's death (1851), he took over his post as the first piano teacher at the institute. In 1858 he was appointed professor. He was a member of the Potsdam masonic lodge Teutonia zur Weisheit.

The grave is not preserved.

References

External links 
 Albert Loeschhorn (Composer, Arranger)
 Brief biographical note (TXT-Datei)
 

1819 births
1905 deaths
Musicians from Berlin
German Romantic composers
Academic staff of the Berlin University of the Arts
German classical pianists
German music educators
German Freemasons